Mohammad Amin Asadi (born 24 December 1998) is an Iranian football striker who plays for Machine Sazi in the Persian Gulf Pro League.

Club career

Persepolis
Asadi joined Persepolis in summer 2017 with a contract until 2021.

Career statistics

Honours
Persepolis
Persian Gulf Pro League (2): 2017–18, 2018–19
Hazfi Cup (1): 2018–19
Iranian Super Cup (2): 2018,  2019
AFC Champions League runner-up: 2018

External links
 Mohammad Amin Asadi at IranLeague.ir

References

1998 births
Living people
Iranian footballers
People from Qom
Persepolis F.C. players
Sanat Mes Kerman F.C. players
Persian Gulf Pro League players
Association football forwards